The William Sydney Porter House or O. Henry House is a historic structure in Downtown Austin, Texas. William Sydney Porter, better known as the author O. Henry, lived there between 1893 and 1895. The Porter house was added to the National Register of Historic Places on June 18, 1973. The house is known today as the O. Henry Museum.  The collection is curated by Melissa Parr, Site Coordinator.

History

The cottage is a simplified version of the Eastlake Style of architecture. The house was built in 1886 and rented between 1893 and 1895 by William Sidney Porter, better known as the author O. Henry. Porter lived in the house with his wife, Athol, and daughter, Margaret, before they moved to Houston, where Porter began writing full-time for the Houston Post. Though primarily associated with his home state of North Carolina, O. Henry set 42 of his stories in Texas.

The residence remained a rental property until 1930 when it was to be demolished to construct a warehouse. In January 1934, a committee representing the Colonial Dames, the Daughters of the American Revolution, the Daughters of 1812, the Daughters of the Republic of Texas, and the Daughters of the Confederacy submitted a proposal to the Austin City Council, that if the city would accept the house as a donation from the Austin Rotary Club and relocate the house, the women's organizations would work to restore the house and open it as a "shrine." The City of Austin had the house moved from its original location at 307 East 4th Street to its current location around the block at Brush Square, 409 East 5th Street. The house was restored and opened as a museum in 1934. The many period pieces on display include some of the Porter's furniture and personal belongings. The structure underwent further restoration in 1994–95 with a renewed roof and the replacement of four brick chimneys lost in 1934.

It is the site of the annual O. Henry Pun-Off, a spoken pun competition. The event is traditionally held the first weekend in May.

References

External links
O. Henry Museum
Museum Info

City of Austin Historic Landmarks
National Register of Historic Places in Austin, Texas
Museums in Austin, Texas
Historic house museums in Texas
Biographical museums in Texas
Literary museums in the United States
Houses in Austin, Texas
Houses completed in 1886
O. Henry
Houses on the National Register of Historic Places in Texas
Relocated buildings and structures in Texas